Freddy García (born 1976) is a Venezuelan baseball pitcher.

Freddy Garcia or Freddie Garcia may also refer to:

 Freddie Garcia (born 1952), Mexican-American soccer player
 Freddy García (infielder) (born 1972), Dominican retired baseball infielder
 Freddy García (football manager) (born 1959), Peruvian football manager
 Freddy García (footballer) (born 1977), Guatemalan footballer
 Freddie M. Garcia (born 1944), Filipino business executive